Lombardy renewed its delegation to the Italian Senate on February 24, 2013. This election was a part of national Italian general election of 2013 even if, according to the Italian Constitution, every senatorial challenge in each Region is a single and independent race.

Lombardy obtained two more seats to the Senate, following the redistricting subsequent to the 2011 Census. For the first time in history, a senatorial election was paired with a regional election.

The election was won by the centre-right coalition between The People of Freedom and the Northern League, differently as it happened at national level and hugely contributing to create that hung parliament which was the general result of the 2013 vote. All the two coalitions lost votes to the newly created Five Star Movement of comedian Beppe Grillo and, in a minor scale, to the Civic Choice of incumbent PM Mario Monti. Ten  provinces gave a plurality to the centre-right coalition, while the provinces of Milan and Mantua preferred Bersani's alliance.

Electoral law
The electoral law for the Senate was established in 2005 by the Calderoli Law, and it is a form of semi-proportional representation. A party presents its own closed list and it can join other parties in alliances. The coalition which receives a plurality automatically wins at least 27 seats. Respecting this condition, seats are divided between coalitions, and subsequently to party lists, using the largest remainder method with a Hare quota. To receive seats, a party must overcome the barrage of 8% of the vote if it contests a single race, or of 3% of the vote if it runs in alliance.

Results

|- style="background-color:#E9E9E9;"
! rowspan="1" style="text-align:left;vertical-align:top;" |Coalition leader
! rowspan="1" style="text-align:center;vertical-align:top;" |votes
! rowspan="1" style="text-align:center;vertical-align:top;" |votes (%)
! rowspan="1" style="text-align:center;vertical-align:top;" |seats
! rowspan="1" style="text-align:left;vertical-align:top;" |Party
! rowspan="1" style="text-align:center;vertical-align:top;" |votes
! rowspan="1" style="text-align:center;vertical-align:top;" |votes (%)
! rowspan="1" style="text-align:center;vertical-align:top;" |swing
! rowspan="1" style="text-align:center;vertical-align:top;" |seats
! rowspan="1" style="text-align:center;vertical-align:top;" |change
|-
! rowspan="3" style="text-align:left;vertical-align:top;" |Silvio Berlusconi
| rowspan="3" style="vertical-align:top;" |2,003,055
| rowspan="3" style="vertical-align:top;" |37.6
| rowspan="3" style="vertical-align:top;" |27

| style="text-align:left;" |The People of Freedom
| style="vertical-align:top;" |1,109,411
| style="vertical-align:top;" |20.8
| style="vertical-align:top;" |−13.6
| style="vertical-align:top;" |16
| style="vertical-align:top;" |−3
|-
| style="text-align:left;" |Northern League
| style="vertical-align:top;" |730,645
| style="vertical-align:top;" |13.7
| style="vertical-align:top;" |−7.0
| style="vertical-align:top;" |11
| style="vertical-align:top;" |0
|-
| style="text-align:left;" |Others
| style="vertical-align:top;" |162,999
| style="vertical-align:top;" |3.1
| style="vertical-align:top;" |+1.5
| style="vertical-align:top;" |-
| style="vertical-align:top;" |-

|-
! rowspan="2" style="text-align:left;vertical-align:top;" |Pier Luigi Bersani
| rowspan="2" style="vertical-align:top;" |1,583,003
| rowspan="2" style="vertical-align:top;" |29.7
| rowspan="2" style="vertical-align:top;" |11

| style="text-align:left;" |Democratic Party
| style="vertical-align:top;" |1,453,385
| style="vertical-align:top;" |27.3
| style="vertical-align:top;" |−0.9
| style="vertical-align:top;" |11
| style="vertical-align:top;" |−4
|-
| style="text-align:left;" |Others
| style="vertical-align:top;" |129,639
| style="vertical-align:top;" |2.4
| style="vertical-align:top;" |+2.4
| style="vertical-align:top;" |-
| style="vertical-align:top;" |-

|-
! rowspan="1" style="text-align:left;vertical-align:top;" |Beppe Grillo
| rowspan="1" style="vertical-align:top;" |927,951
| rowspan="1" style="vertical-align:top;" |17.4
| rowspan="1" style="vertical-align:top;" |7

| style="text-align:left;" |Five Star Movement
| style="vertical-align:top;" |927,951
| style="vertical-align:top;" |17.4
| style="vertical-align:top;" |+16.9
| style="vertical-align:top;" |7
| style="vertical-align:top;" |+7

|-
! rowspan="1" style="text-align:left;vertical-align:top;" |Mario Monti
| rowspan="1" style="vertical-align:top;" |572,046
| rowspan="1" style="vertical-align:top;" |10.7
| rowspan="1" style="vertical-align:top;" |4

| style="text-align:left;" |With Monti for Italy
| style="vertical-align:top;" |572,046
| style="vertical-align:top;" |10.7
| style="vertical-align:top;" |+6.5
| style="vertical-align:top;" |4
| style="vertical-align:top;" |+4

|-
! rowspan="1" style="text-align:left;vertical-align:top;" |Others
| rowspan="1" style="vertical-align:top;" |236,822
| rowspan="1" style="vertical-align:top;" |4.6
| rowspan="1" style="vertical-align:top;" |0

| style="text-align:left;" |Others
| style="vertical-align:top;" |236,822
| style="vertical-align:top;" |4.6
| style="vertical-align:top;" |−5.8
| style="vertical-align:top;" |-
| style="vertical-align:top;" |−2

|-
|- style="background-color:#E9E9E9;"
! rowspan="1" style="text-align:left;vertical-align:top;" |Total coalitions
! rowspan="1" style="text-align:right;vertical-align:top;" |5,323,027
! rowspan="1" style="text-align:right;vertical-align:top;" |100.0
! rowspan="1" style="text-align:right;vertical-align:top;" |49
! rowspan="1" style="text-align:left;vertical-align:top;" |Total parties
! rowspan="1" style="text-align:right;vertical-align:top;" |5,323,027
! rowspan="1" style="text-align:right;vertical-align:top;" |100.0
! rowspan="1" style="text-align:right;vertical-align:top;" |=
! rowspan="1" style="text-align:right;vertical-align:top;" |49
! rowspan="1" style="text-align:right;vertical-align:top;" |+2

Source: Ministry of the Interior

Lombard delegation to Senate

The People of Freedom
 Silvio Berlusconi
 Roberto Formigoni
 Sandro Bondi
 Paolo Bonaiuti
 Mario Mantovani
 Paolo Romani
 Giacomo Caliendo
 Paolo Galimberti
 Andrea Mandelli
 Alfredo Messina
 Salvatore Sciascia
 Francesco Colucci
 Antonio Verro
 Riccardo Conti
 Giancarlo Serafini
 Lucio Barani

Democratic Party
 Massimo Mucchetti
 Franco Mirabelli
 Emilia De Biasi
 Annalisa Silvestro
 Paolo Corsini
 Roberto Cociancich
 Luciano Pizzetti
 Lucrezia Ricchiuti
 Mauro Del Barba
 Mario Tronti
 Erica D'Adda

Northern League
 Roberto Calderoli
 Giulio Tremonti
 Massimo Garavaglia
 Giacomo Stucchi
 Silvana Comaroli
 Paolo Arrigoni
 Gian Marco Centinaio
 Raffaele Volpi
 Stefano Candiani
 Jonny Crosio
 Nunziante Consiglio

Five Star Movement
 Giovanna Mangili
 Vito Crimi
 Luigi Gaetti
 Monica Casaletto
 Laura Bignami
 Luis Alberto Orellana
 Bruno Marton

With Monti for Italy
 Gabriele Albertini
 Pietro Ichino
 Mario Mauro
 Benedetto Della Vedova

Links
 2013 Italian general election

Elections in Lombardy
2013 elections in Italy
February 2013 events in Italy